Asociación Deportiva Comerciantes Fútbol Club (sometimes referred as Comerciantes) is a Peruvian football club, playing in the city of Belén, Maynas, Loreto, Peru.

History
The Comerciantes FC was founded on August 20, 2017.

In 2018 Copa Perú, the club classified to the Departamental Stage, but was eliminated by Estudiantil CNI and Caballococha in the Cuadrangular Final.

In 2019 Copa Perú, the club was eliminated by Sport Estrella in the Quarterfinals.

In 2022 Copa Perú, despite not winning the championship, they were promoted to Liga 2 for the 2023 season..

Honours

National
Copa Perú:
Runner-up (1): 2022

Regional
Liga Departamental de Loreto:
Winners (1): 2019
Runner-up (1): 2022

Liga Provincial de Maynas:
Winners (1): 2018, 2019
Runner-up (1): 2022

Liga Distrital de Belén:
Winners (3): 2018, 2019, 2022

See also
List of football clubs in Peru
Peruvian football league system

References

Football clubs in Peru
Association football clubs established in 2017
2017 establishments in Peru